The Sanctuary of the Apparitions (Santuario das Aparicións in Galician and Santuario de las Apariciones in Spanish) is located in Pontevedra, Spain. According to Sister Lúcia, it was here that the child Jesus and the Virgin Mary appeared to her in December 1925 with Mary's heart surrounded by thorns and revealed to her the First Saturdays Devotion. Lúcia also said that the child Jesus visited her alone in February 1926, near the sanctuary's garden, to urge her to do more to promote the five Saturdays Devotion. 

It is the third most visited Marian pilgrimage destination in the world, with over 12 million visits recorded up to 2022.

Location 
The sanctuary is located at 3 Sor Lucía Street in the historic centre of Pontevedra.

History 
On the site where the sanctuary is located, there was a building from the early Middle Ages, of which traces of stonemasonry and a walled door with decorative reliefs have been preserved.

The building was constructed in the mid-16th century. In the 19th century, the building was the palace of the Arias Teijeiro family (Antonio and José, father and son), the latter being a Carlist politician and universal minister.

In the early 1920s, the Marquis of Riestra rented the building to the Dorothean sisters.

In 1925, Sister Lúcia, one of the three visionaries of Fátima, Portugal, became a Dorothean sister in Galicia. While in her room in this convent in Pontevedra two months after her arrival, on 10 December 1925, Sister Lucia had a vision of the child Jesus and the Virgin Mary with her heart surrounded by thorns. The second apparition of the child Jesus took place on 15 February 1926 in the convent garden. In 1927, Sister Lucia wrote that Our Lady, in the apparition of 1925, had explained to her what communion on First Saturdays consisted of.

The Holy Communion of the First Saturdays consists in going to confession, receiving Holy Communion every first Saturday of the month for five months (in reparation for five types of blasphemy), praying the rosary and meditating on its mysteries.

Pope John Paul II granted it the status of a sanctuary in 2000 on the occasion of the 75th anniversary of the apparitions.

The building was renovated in 2022, with the refurbishment of the second floor and a new roof.

The sanctuary is known as the "Spanish Fátima".

Description 
The religious building, also known as the House of Apparitions, has two floors. The façade is made of stone and is in a simple style. On the ground floor, the stone base and the 15th century semicircular arches supported by Tuscan half-columns that frame the door and windows are noteworthy.

Inside, there is a main chapel (on the ground floor) and a small chapel where the Child Jesus and the Virgin Mary appeared to Sister Lúcia, the visionary of Fátima. There is also a walled doorway with an ogee arch from the 16th century. On the first floor are the rooms of the convent's hostel, which has 60 beds in different rooms with up to four beds, and which the Bishops' Conference is going to turn into a pilgrims' hostel. On the second floor is the cell where, according to Christian belief, the Virgin Mary appeared to Sister Lúcia on 10 December 1925.

The building also has an interior garden where the child Jesus appeared to Sister Lúcia on 15 February 1926. The medieval cloister, dating from the end of the 15th century, has semicircular arches supported by Tuscan columns.

Gallery

References

Bibliography

See also

Related articles 
 Pontevedra apparitions
 Shrines to the Virgin Mary

External links 
 
  Official website of the Sanctuary
  Sanctuary plans
 Fátima Pontevedra - La comunión reparadora

Catholic Church in Spain
Shrines to the Virgin Mary
Churches in Galicia (Spain)
Tourist attractions in Galicia (Spain)
Churches in Pontevedra